Fairview High School is a PK-12 school in Grant, unincorporated Allen Parish, Louisiana, United States.  it usually has around 425 students. It is a part of the Allen Parish School Board.

Athletics
Fairview High athletics competes in the LHSAA.

References

External links
 Fairview High School

Schools in Allen Parish, Louisiana
Public high schools in Louisiana
Public middle schools in Louisiana
Public elementary schools in Louisiana